Trilobodrilus is a genus of bristle worms in the family Dinophilidae. There are about five described species in Trilobodrilus.

Species
These five species belong to the genus Trilobodrilus:
 Trilobodrilus axi Westheide, 1967
 Trilobodrilus heideri Remane, 1925
 Trilobodrilus hermaphroditus Riser, 1999
 Trilobodrilus nipponicus Uchida & Okuda, 1943
 Trilobodrilus windansea Kerbl, Vereide, Gonzalez, Rouse & Worsaae, 2018

References

Further reading

 
 
 
 

Articles created by Qbugbot

Polychaete genera